Suppressor of cytokine signaling 3 (SOCS3 or SOCS-3) is a protein that in humans is encoded by the SOCS3 gene. 
This gene encodes a member of the STAT-induced STAT inhibitor (SSI), also known as suppressor of cytokine signaling (SOCS), family. SSI family members are cytokine-inducible negative regulators of cytokine signaling.

SOCS3 is a conserved gene, found in across the animal kingdom, including Drosophila, chickens, and crocodiles.

Function 

The expression of SOCS3 gene is induced by various cytokines, including IL6, IL10, and interferon (IFN)-gamma.

For signaling of IL-6, Epo, GCSF and Leptin, binding of SOCS3 to the respective cytokine receptor has been found to be crucial for the inhibitory function of SOCS3.

Overexpression of SOCS3 inhibits insulin signaling in adipose tissue and the liver, but not in muscle. But deletion of SOCS3 in the skeletal muscle of mice protects against obesity-related insulin resistance.

SOCS3 contributes to both leptin resistance and insulin resistance as a result of increased ceramide synthesis. For that reason, studies have shown that removal of the SOCS gene prevents against insulin resistance in obesity

Studies of the mouse counterpart of this gene suggested the roles of this gene in the negative regulation of fetal liver hematopoiesis, and placental development.

The SOCS3 protein can bind to JAK2 kinase, and inhibits the activity of JAK2 kinase.

Interactions 

SOCS3 has been shown to interact with:
 Erythropoietin receptor, 
 Glycoprotein 130, 
 Insulin-like growth factor 1 receptor,
 Janus kinase 2, 
 PTPN11,  and
 RAS p21 protein activator 1.

Regulation 

There is some evidence that the expression of SOCS3 is regulated by the microRNA miR-203, miR-409-3p and miR-1896.

See also 
 SOCS
 JAK-STAT signaling pathway

References

Further reading